Zitina Aokuso (born 23 November 1998) is an Australian professional basketball player.

Career

WNBL
Aokuso began her WNBL career in her home state, signing with the Townsville Fire for the 2017–18 WNBL season. By signing in the league on a professional contract, Aokuso would no longer be eligible for college basketball. In her debut season, playing alongside the likes of Suzy Batkovic, Cayla George and Kelly Wilson, Aokuso & the Fire took hom the WNBL Championship. 

In 2018, Aokuso agreed to remain in Townsville after signing a two-year contract with the Fire.

National Team

Youth Level
Aokuso made her international debut for the Gems at the 2016 FIBA Under-18 Oceania Championship in Suva, Fiji. Australia would take home the gold and Aokuso herself was named MVP of the gold medal game. Aokuso would then go on to represent the Gems at the 2017 Under-19 World Cup in Italy the following year, where they finished in sixth place overall.

Senior Level
In April 2019, Aokuso was named to her first ever Opals squad and attended her first team camp on the Gold Coast. Aokuso was then named to the Opals selection camp in Phoenix, Arizona ahead of the 2019 FIBA Asia Cup.

References

External links

1998 births
Living people
Australian women's basketball players
Townsville Fire players
Forwards (basketball)
Centers (basketball)
Sportswomen from Queensland